The 1928 Rice Owls football team was an American football team that represented Rice University as a member of the Southwest Conference (SWC) during the 1928 college football season. In its first and only season under head coach Claude Rothgeb, the team compiled a 2–7 record (0–5 against SWC opponents) and was outscored by a total of 174 to 83.

Schedule

References

Rice
Rice Owls football seasons
Rice Owls football